The Association of Public Radio Stations was a radio network in the United States from 1973 to 1977.

It was formed on May 24, 1973, becoming the main public radio representative to federal agencies and Congress. In 1977 it merged with National Public Radio (NPR), which was then primarily a distributor of radio content. It was only after this merger that NPR became the broader public radio body it is today.

See also 
 America's Public Television Stations: A similar trade organization for non-profit TV

References

External links 

 Kenneth J. Garry papers at the University of Maryland libraries. Garry worked at the Association of Public Radio Stations and his papers include correspondence, board minutes, financial reports, satellite and information technology reports, and other documents from his time working for the Association of Public Radio Stations.

Radio organizations in the United States
Public radio in the United States
Trade associations based in the United States
Organizations established in 1973
Organizations disestablished in 1977